Sati (smṛti), literally "memory" or "retention", commonly translated as mindfulness, "to remember to observe," is an essential part of Buddhist practice. It has the related meanings of calling to mind the wholesome dhammas such as the four establishments of mindfulness, the five faculties, the five powers, the seven awakening-factors, the Noble Eightfold Path, and the attainment of insight, and the actual practice of maintaining a lucid awareness of the dhammas of bodily and mental phenomena, in order to counter the arising of unwholesome states, and to develop wholesome states. It is the first factor of the Seven Factors of Enlightenment. "Correct" or "right" mindfulness (Pali: sammā-sati, Sanskrit samyak-smṛti) is the seventh element of the Noble Eightfold Path.

Definition
The Buddhist term translated into English as "mindfulness," "to remember to observe," originates in the Pali term sati and in its Sanskrit counterpart smṛti. According to Robert Sharf, the meaning of these terms has been the topic of extensive debate and discussion. Smṛti originally meant "to remember", "to recollect", "to bear in mind", as in the Vedic tradition of remembering sacred texts. The term sati also means "to remember" the teachings of scriptures. In the Satipațțhāna-sutta the term sati means to maintain awareness of reality, where sense-perceptions are understood to be illusions and thus the true nature of phenomena can be seen. Sharf refers to the Milindapanha, which explained that the arising of sati calls to mind the wholesome dhammas such as the four establishments of mindfulness, the five faculties, the five powers, the seven awakening-factors, the Noble Eightfold Path, and the attainment of insight.
According to Rupert Gethin, 

Sharf further notes that this has little to do with "bare attention", the popular contemporary interpretation of sati, "since it entails, among other things, the proper discrimination of the moral valence of phenomena as they arise". According to Vetter, dhyana may have been the original core practice of the Buddha, which aided the maintenance of mindfulness.

Etymology

It originates from the Pali term sati and its Sanskrit counterpart smṛti. From Sanskrit it was translated into trenpa in Tibetan (transliteration: dran pa) and nian  in Chinese.

Pali
In 1881, Thomas William Rhys Davids first translated sati into English mindfulness in sammā-sati "Right Mindfulness; the active, watchful mind". Noting that Daniel John Gogerly (1845) initially rendered sammā-sati as "Correct meditation", Davids explained, 

Henry Alabaster, in The Wheel of the Law: Buddhism Illustrated From Siamese Sources by the Modern Buddhist, A Life of Buddha, and an Account of the Phrabat (1871), had earlier defined "Satipatthan/Smrityupasthana" as "The act of keeping one's self mindful."

The English term mindfulness already existed before it came to be used in a (western) Buddhist context. It was first recorded as mindfulness in 1530 (John Palsgrave translates French pensee), as mindfulnesse in 1561, and mindfulness in 1817. Morphologically earlier terms include mindful (first recorded in 1340), mindfully (1382), and the obsolete  (ca. 1200).

John D. Dunne, an associate professor at Emory University whose current research focuses especially on the concept of "mindfulness" in both theoretical and practical contexts, asserts that the translation of sati and  smṛti as mindfulness is confusing and that a number of Buddhist scholars have started trying to establish "retention" as the preferred alternative.

Bhikkhu Bodhi also points to the meaning of "sati" as "memory":

However, in What Does Mindfulness Really Mean? A Canonical Perspective (2011), Bhikkhu Bodhi pointed out that sati is not only "memory":

Also, he quoted the below-mentioned comment by Thomas William Rhys Davids as "remarkable acumen":

Sanskrit

The Sanskrit word smṛti  (also transliterated variously as smriti, smRti, or sm'Rti) literally means "that which is remembered", and refers both to "mindfulness" in Buddhism and "a category of metrical texts" in Hinduism, considered second in authority to the Śruti scriptures.

Monier Monier-Williams's Sanskrit-English Dictionary differentiates eight meanings of smṛti , "remembrance, reminiscence, thinking of or upon, calling to mind, memory":
 memory as one of the Vyabhicāri-bhāvas [transient feelings];
 Memory (personified either as the daughter of Daksha and wife of Aṅgiras or as the daughter of Dharma and Medhā);
 the whole body of sacred tradition or what is remembered by human teachers (in contradistinction to Śruti or what is directly heard or revealed to the Rishis; in its widest acceptation this use of the term Smṛti includes the 6 Vedangas, the Sūtras both Śrauta and Grhya, the Manusmṛti, the Itihāsas (e.g., the Mahābhārata and Ramayana), the Puranas and the Nītiśāstras, "according to such and such a traditional precept or legal text";
 the whole body of codes of law as handed down memoriter or by tradition (esp. the codes of Manusmṛti, Yājñavalkya Smṛti and the 16 succeeding inspired lawgivers) … all these lawgivers being held to be inspired and to have based their precepts on the Vedas;
 symbolical name for the number 18 (from the 18 lawgivers above);
 a kind of meter;
 name of the letter g- ;
 desire, wish

Chinese

Buddhist scholars translated smṛti with the Chinese word   "study; read aloud; think of; remember; remind". Nian is commonly used in Modern Standard Chinese words such as   "concept; idea",   "cherish the memory of; think of",   "read; study", and   "thought; idea; intention". Two specialized Buddhist terms are   "chant the name of Buddha; pray to Buddha" and   "chant/recite sutras".

This Chinese character nian  is composed of jin  "now; this" and xin  "heart; mind". Bernhard Karlgren graphically explains nian meaning "reflect, think; to study, learn by heart, remember; recite, read – to have  present to  the mind". The Chinese character nian or nien  is pronounced as Korean yeom or yŏm , Japanese  or nen, and Vietnamese .

A Dictionary of Chinese Buddhist Terms gives basic translations of nian: "Recollection, memory; to think on, reflect; repeat, intone; a thought; a moment."

The Digital Dictionary of Buddhism gives more detailed translations of nian "mindfulness, memory":
Recollection (Skt. smṛti; Tib. dran pa). To recall, remember. That which is remembered. The function of remembering. The operation of the mind of not forgetting an object. Awareness, concentration. Mindfulness of the Buddha, as in Pure Land practice. In Abhidharma-kośa theory, one of the ten omnipresent factors . In Yogâcāra, one of the five 'object-dependent' mental factors ;
Settled recollection; (Skt. sthāpana; Tib. gnas pa). To ascertain one's thoughts;
To think within one's mind (without expressing in speech). To contemplate; meditative wisdom;
Mind, consciousness;
A thought; a thought-moment; an instant of thought. (Skt. kṣana);
Patience, forbearance.

Alternate translations

The terms sati/smriti have been translated as:
 Attention (Jack Kornfield)
 Awareness
 Concentrated attention (Mahasi Sayadaw)
 Inspection (Herbert Guenther)
 Mindful attention
 Mindfulness
 Recollecting mindfulness (Alexander Berzin)
 Recollection (Erik Pema Kunsang, Buddhadasa Bhikkhu)
 Reflective awareness (Buddhadasa Bhikkhu)
 Remindfulness (James H. Austin)
 Retention
 Self-recollection (Jack Kornfield)

Practice
Originally, mindfulness provided the way to liberation, by paying attention to sensory experience, preventing the arising of disturbing thoughts and emotions which cause the further chain of reactions leading to rebirth. In the later tradition, especially Theravada, mindfulness is an antidote to delusion (Pali: Moha), and is considered as such one of the 'powers' (Pali: bala) that contribute to the attainment of nirvana, in particular when it is coupled with clear comprehension of whatever is taking place.  Nirvana is a state of being in which greed, hatred and delusion (Pali: moha) have been overcome and abandoned, and are absent from the mind.

Satipaṭṭhāna - guarding the senses

The Satipaṭṭhāna Sutta (Sanskrit: Smṛtyupasthāna Sūtra) is an early text dealing with mindfulness. The Theravada Nikayas prescribe that one should establish mindfulness (satipaṭṭhāna) in one's day-to-day life, maintaining as much as possible a calm awareness of the four upassanā: one's body, feelings, mind, and dharmas.

According to Grzegorz Polak, the four upassanā have been misunderstood by the developing Buddhist tradition, including Theravada, to refer to four different foundations. According to Polak, the four upassanā do not refer to four different foundations, but to the awareness of four different aspects of raising mindfulness:
 the six sense-bases which one needs to be aware of (kāyānupassanā); 
 contemplation on vedanās, which arise with the contact between the senses and their objects (vedanānupassanā);
 the altered states of mind to which this practice leads (cittānupassanā);
 the development from the five hindrances  to the seven factors of enlightenment (dhammānupassanā).

Rupert Gethin notes that the contemporary Vipassana movement interprets the Satipatthana Sutta as "describing a pure form of insight (vipassanā) meditation" for which samatha (calm) and jhāna are not necessary. Yet, in pre-sectarian Buddhism, the establishment of mindfulness was placed before the practice of the jhanas, and associated with the abandonment of the five hindrances and the entry into the first jhana.

According to Paul Williams, referring to Erich Frauwallner, mindfulness provided the way to liberation, "constantly watching sensory experience in order to prevent the arising of cravings which would power future experience into rebirths." Buddhadasa also argued that mindfulness provides the means to prevent the arising of disturbing thought and emotions, which cause the further chain of reactions leading to rebirth of the ego and selfish thought and behavior.

According to Vetter, dhyana may have been the original core practice of the Buddha, which aided the maintenance of mindfulness.

Samprajaña, apramāda and atappa

Satii was famously translated as "bare attention" by Nyanaponika Thera. Yet, in Buddhist practice, "mindfulness" is more than just "bare attention"; it has the more comprehensive and active meaning of samprajaña, "clear comprehension," and apramāda, "vigilance". All three terms are sometimes (confusingly) translated as "mindfulness", but they all have specific shades of meaning.

In a publicly available correspondence between Bhikkhu Bodhi and B. Alan Wallace, Bodhi has described Ven. Nyanaponika Thera's views on "right mindfulness" and sampajañña as follows:

In the Satipaṭṭhāna Sutta, sati and sampajañña are combined with atappa (Pali; Sanskrit: ātapaḥ), or "ardency," and the three together comprise yoniso manasikara (Pali; Sanskrit: yoniśas manaskāraḥ), "appropriate attention" or "wise reflection."

Anapanasati - mindfulness of breathing

Ānāpānasati (Pali; Sanskrit: ānāpānasmṛti; Chinese: 安那般那; Pīnyīn: ānnàbānnà; Sinhala: ආනා පානා සති), meaning "mindfulness of breathing" ("sati" means mindfulness; "ānāpāna" refers to inhalation and exhalation), is a form of Buddhist meditation now common to the Tibetan, Zen, Tiantai, and Theravada schools of Buddhism, as well as western-based mindfulness programs. Anapanasati means to feel the sensations caused by the movements of the breath in the body, as is practiced in the context of mindfulness. According to tradition, Anapanasati was originally taught by the Buddha in several sutras including the Ānāpānasati Sutta. (MN 118)

The Āgamas of early Buddhism discuss ten forms of mindfulness. According to Nan Huaijin, the Ekottara Āgama emphasizes mindfulness of breathing more than any of the other methods, and provides the most specific teachings on this one form of mindfulness.

Vipassanā - discriminating insight

Satipatthana, as four foundations of mindfulness, c.q. anapanasati, "mindfulness of breathing," is being employed to attain Vipassanā (Pāli), insight into the true nature of reality as impermanent and anatta, c.q. sunyata, lacking any permanent essence.

In the Theravadin context, this entails insight into the three marks of existence, namely the impermanence of and the unsatisfactoriness of every conditioned thing that exists, and non-self. In Mahayana contexts, it entails insight into what is variously described as sunyata, dharmata, the inseparability of appearance and emptiness (two truths doctrine), clarity and emptiness, or bliss and emptiness.

Vipassanā is commonly used as one of two poles for the categorization of types of Buddhist practice, the other being samatha (Pāli; Sanskrit: śamatha). Though both terms appear in the Sutta Pitaka, Gombrich and Brooks argue that the distinction as two separate paths originates in the earliest interpretations of the Sutta Pitaka, not in the suttas themselves. Vipassana and samatha are described as qualities which contribute to the development of mind (bhāvanā). According to Vetter, Bronkhorst and Gombrich, discriminating insight into transiency as a separate path to liberation was a later development, under pressure of developments in Indian religious thinking, which saw "liberating insight" as essential to liberation. This may also have been due to an over-literal interpretation by later scholastics of the terminology used by the Buddha, and to the problems involved with the practice of dhyana, and the need to develop an easier method. According to Wynne, the Buddha combined meditative stabilisation with mindful awareness and "an insight into the nature of this meditative experience."

Various traditions disagree which techniques belong to which pole. According to the contemporary Theravada orthodoxy, samatha is used as a preparation for vipassanā, pacifying the mind and strengthening the concentration in order to allow the work of insight, which leads to liberation.

Vipassanā-meditation has gained popularity in the west through the modern Buddhist vipassana movement, modeled after Theravāda Buddhism meditation practices, which employs vipassanā and ānāpāna (anapanasati, mindfulness of breathing) meditation as its primary techniques and places emphasis on the teachings of the  Sutta.

Mindfulness (psychology)

Mindfulness practice, inherited from the Buddhist tradition, is being employed in psychology to alleviate a variety of mental and physical conditions, including obsessive-compulsive disorder, anxiety, and in the prevention of relapse in depression and drug addiction.

"Bare attention"
Georges Dreyfus has expressed unease with the definition of mindfulness as "bare attention" or "nonelaborative, nonjudgmental, present-centered awareness", stressing that mindfulness in Buddhist context means also "remembering", which indicates that the function of mindfulness also includes the retention of information. Dreyfus concludes his examination by stating:

Robert H. Sharf notes that Buddhist practice is aimed at the attainment of "correct view", not just "bare attention":

Jay L. Garfield, quoting Shantideva and other sources, stresses that mindfulness is constituted by the union of two functions, calling to mind and vigilantly retaining in mind. He demonstrates that there is a direct connection between the practice of mindfulness and the cultivation of morality – at least in the context of Buddhism from which modern interpretations of mindfulness are stemming.

See also

 
Buddhism and psychology
Buddhist meditation
Sampajanna
Satipatthana
Dennis Lewis
Eternal Now (New Age)
Henepola Gunaratana
John Garrie
Mahasati Meditation
Mahasi Sayadaw
Metacognition
Mindfulness (journal)
Nepsis (Eastern Orthodox Christianity)
S.N. Goenka
Samu (Zen)
Shinzen Young
Taqwa and dhikr, related Islamic concepts
Thich Nhat Hanh
Vipassana

Notes

References

Sources

External links

Mindfulness Research Guide at the American Mindfulness Research Association. Retrieved 23 December 2013.
Oxford University Mindfulness Research Centre. Retrieved 23 December 2013.
What is Mindfulness? Buddhism for Beginners

Buddhist meditation
Plum Village Tradition
Mind–body interventions
Mindfulness (Buddhism)
Wholesome factors in Buddhism
Pali words and phrases